Nepean Sound is a sound on the North Coast of British Columbia, Canada.  It lies north of Caamaño Sound, and separates Banks, Pitt, Campania and Trutch Islands.

See also
Estevan Group

References

North Coast of British Columbia
Sounds of British Columbia